Middleton School District is a school district based in Middleton, Idaho, United States. It operates Middleton High School and several lower-grade schools.

2018 Halloween incident
Photographs of teachers at Heights Elementary School dressed as the proposed United States-Mexico border wall were posted to Facebook and were widely shared. The school district subsequently announced that the teachers would be placed on paid leave and staff would be provided with sensitivity training.

References

External links

School districts in Idaho
Education in Canyon County, Idaho